The 2021 Sudirman Cup knockout stage was held at the Energia Areena in Vantaa, Finland, from 1 to 3 October 2021.

The knockout stage was the second and final stage of the competition, following the group stage. It began with the quarter-finals (1 October), followed by the semi-finals (2 October), and the final (3 October). The two highest-finished teams in 4 groups (8 teams in total) qualified to the knockout stage.

Qualified teams

Bracket
The draw was held on 30 September 2021, after the Japan against Malaysia tie. The group runners-up were drawn against the group winners. Teams from the same group cannot be drawn against each other.

Quarter-finals

Quarter-final 1

Quarter-final 2

Quarter-final 3

Quarter-final 4

Semi-finals

Semi-final 1

Semi-final 2

Final

References

External links

2021 Sudirman Cup